Byron Chung is a Korean actor who has guest-starred in several television series and mainstream films. Some of his notable roles include appearances in television shows such as Temperatures Rising, The Streets of San Francisco, The Fantastic Journey, four episodes of Baa Baa Black Sheep, The Rockford Files, Salvage 1, seven episodes of M*A*S*H, Hunter, Gabriel's Fire, The Agency, The West Wing, Alias, and four episodes of Lost. He was a regular, playing PROBE Control technician Kuroda, on early episodes of the 1972 TV series Search, and appeared in the pilot film for that series, Probe.  Most recently he appeared on an episode of Dark Blue where he played a nefarious, upscale Korean mobster.

Television appearances and characters
 1972-1973: Search - All seasons (Kuroda)
 1976: Baa, Baa, Black Sheep - Season 1, Episodes 17 & 24 (Cpt. Tomio 'Tommy' Harachi)
 1977: Baa, Baa, Black Sheep - Season 2, Episodes 3 & 5 (Cpt. Tomio 'Tommy' Harachi)
 1984: Airwolf - Season 2, Episode 13 (Hua)
 1990: Hunter - Season 7, Episode 6 (Sam Woo)
 2003: Alias - Season 3, Episode 12 (Colonel Yu)
 2004: Lost - Season 1, Episode 17 (Mr Paik)
 2006: Lost - Season 3, Episodes 2 - 18  (Mr Paik)
 2008: Lost - Season 4, episode 12 (Mr Paik)

References

External links

South Korean male film actors
South Korean male television actors
Living people
Year of birth missing (living people)
20th-century South Korean male actors
21st-century South Korean male actors